Deja Vu - It's '82 is the debut and only studio album by the hip-hop group Crusaders For Real Hip-Hop. the album was released on March 17, 1992, on Profile Records. Production was handled entirely by group member Tony D. Two singles were released: "That's How It Is" and "We Love the Hotties".

Track listing

References

External links
 

1992 debut albums
Profile Records albums